Ynys Môn may refer to:

 Anglesey, an island of north-west Wales in the Irish Sea 
 Ynys Môn (UK Parliament constituency), the island's House of Commons electoral seat
 Ynys Môn (Senedd constituency), its coterminous seat in the Welsh Parliament or Senedd Cymru
 Isle of Anglesey County Council, the local government authority for the island

See also 
 Mon (disambiguation)
 Anglesey (disambiguation)